The Black Gestapo (also released as Ghetto Warriors) is a 1975 American crime film about a vigilante named General Ahmed, who starts an inner-city "People's Army" to protect the black citizens of Watts. However, when the Army succeeds in chasing the mob out of town, Ahmed is replaced by his colleague Colonel Kojah, who reforms the movement into a National Socialist criminal organization in order to have complete control over the town.

It was written and directed by Lee Frost, and stars Rod Perry, Charles P. Robinson, Phil Hoover, Ed Cross and features a cameo from Russ Meyer regular Uschi Digard. It depicts African-American men dressed as Nazis and contains many scenes of violence (including a castration scene) and soft-core nudity.

Cast
 Rod Perry as General Ahmed
 Charles P. Robinson as Colonel Kojah
 Phil Hoover as Vito
 Ed Cross as Delmay
 Angela Brent as Marsha
 Wes Bishop as Ernest
 Lee Frost as Vincent
 Dona Desmond as White whore
 Charles Howerton as Joe
 Rai Tasco as Dr. Lisk
 David Bryant as Dope Pusher
 J. Christopher Sullivan as T. V. Owner
 Susan Randolph as Vincent's Girl
 Colin Male as Newscaster
 Gene Russell as Gambler
 Uschi Digard as Kojah's Girl
 Chuck Wells as Trooper
 Bill Quinn as The Accountant
 Tim Wade as Hood
 Roger Gentry as Hood

Critical responses
Writing in Allmovie, critic Donald Guarisco wrote that the film "lives up [to] the offensive potential of its title by cramming every bit of nastiness it can muster into its short running time," and that although it "is socially irresponsible [...] At its best, it's even inspired in a very twisted sort of way." Critic Matthew Roe wrote in Under the Radar magazine that the "nazi iconography in this film is as subtle as the apocolypse," that "everything about this film screams 70s action schlock," and although "there are scattershot moments of interesting introspection, the movie keeps the dial cranked up and keeps cheap thrills coming its entire runtime."

As the Gestapo was the interior secret service of the Third Reich, it appears that the producers of the movie mixed the name up with the paramilitaric SS which was founded as the private army of the Nazi Party and fits much more to the organisation showed in the movie, so the movie's title would have been more accurate as "The Black SS" rather than "The Black Gestapo".

See also
 List of American films of 1975

References

External links
 

The Black Gestapo at TV Guide (1987 write-up was originally published in The Motion Picture Guide)
The Black Gestapo at Trash City

1975 films
1970s action thriller films
American action thriller films
1975 crime drama films
1970s exploitation films
Blaxploitation films
American crime drama films
American vigilante films
Films directed by Lee Frost
1970s English-language films
1970s American films